Qazi Kandi (also Romanized as Qāzī Kandī and Qāẕī Kandī) is a village in Oryad Rural District, in the Central District of Mahneshan County, Zanjan Province, Iran. At the 2006 census, its population was 369, in 86 families.

References 

Populated places in Mahneshan County